The Chilean tinamou (Nothoprocta perdicaria) is a type of tinamou commonly found in high altitude shrubland in subtropical regions of central Chile.

Taxonomy
All tinamous are from the family Tinamidae, and in the larger scheme are also ratites. Unlike other ratites, tinamou can fly, although in general, they are not strong fliers. All ratites evolved from prehistoric flying birds, and tinamou are the closest living relative of these birds. Crypturellus is formed from three Latin or Greek words.  kruptos meaning covered or hidden, oura meaning tail, and ellus meaning diminutive.  Therefore, Crypturellus means small hidden tail.

Subspecies
The Chilean tinamou has two subspecies as follows:
 N. p. perdicaria, nominate race, occurs in the semi-arid grasslands of north central Chile; Atacama, Coquimbo, Valparaíso, Santiago, O'Higgins, Maule and Ñuble Regions.
 N. p. sanborni occurs in south central Chile; Maule, Ñuble, Bio-bio, Araucanía Regions, and northern Los Lagos Region and adjacent Argentina

Distribution and habitat
The Chilean tinamou can be found in the high altitude shrubland at  altitude. This species is native to all of Chile except southern Los Lagos, Tarapacá, Antofagasta, Aisén, and Magallanes y Antarctica Chilena. This tinamou can also be found in arid mountain forests in association with such trees as Acacia caven, Porlieria chilensis and the endangered Jubaea chilensis. It has been introduced to Easter Island.

Description
It is almost tail-less and is stocky in shape. It has a bill that is curved and similar to the California quail. It has thick, short, pale, yellowish legs. It generally walks upright and has "short tail and tail coverts drooping behind legs." The pattern on its upper body looks striped, but is more complex in detail. It has a buffy face with a dark eyeline that is drooping and a small strip on its cheek, with a lighter colored crown. Its neck is brown and its lower neck has dark spots. It has a complex patterns that streak on the side of the chest, which is grey. The Chilean tinamou, just south of the Maule Region, has a brownish chest instead of a grey chest and more and reddish brown stripes on its upperbody and buttocks. For both regions, it has large wings that cover the body when on ground, and when flying the wings appear large and reddish brown underneath. The wings are also rounded.

It has a loud stride whistle that sounds double-syllabled and sounds like "sweee weee." When under stress, it releases a lowering series of whistles that sounds like "swee wee wee wee" along with fast-paced wing sounds.

Behavior
The females lay 10-12 glossy eggs in a scrape. The male incubates the eggs and raises the chicks. The eggs are covered with feathers when left unattended. Incubation is around 21 days. The chicks are buff with dark stripes, and run soon after hatching and fly when half-grown. Later in life blue or gray spots may appear.

Conservation

Footnotes

References
 
 
 
 
 
Hogan, Michael C.(2008) Chilean Wine Palm: Jubaea chilensis, GlobalTwitcher.com, ed. Nicklas Stromberg
 
Jaramillo, Alvaro. Birds of Chile. Princeton: Princeton University Press (2003).

External links
 Chilean Tinamou videos, photos & sounds on the Internet Bird Collection

Chilean tinamou
Birds of Chile
Chilean tinamou
Chilean tinamou
Taxa named by Heinrich von Kittlitz